Dylanesque is the twelfth studio album by English singer Bryan Ferry, released on 5 March 2007 by Virgin Records. The album consists of cover versions of ten Bob Dylan songs and one traditional song that Dylan himself covered on his first album. It charted at number five in both the United Kingdom and Sweden.  Soon after completion of the album, Ferry returned with most of the same musicians to film live re-recordings of the songs in the studio.  The film, which includes interview clips with Ferry, is available on the DVD, Dylanesque Live: The London Sessions.

Critical reception
Reviewing for AllMusic, critic Stephen Thomas Erlewine wrote of the album, "Ferry has never felt quite so comfortable as he does here, and if that may not be exactly what all listeners are looking for when they listen to his work, this is the quality that will make Dylanesque a small understated gem for certain segments of his die-hard fans."

Track listing
All tracks composed by Bob Dylan, except where noted.

 "Just Like Tom Thumb's Blues" – 3:50
 "Simple Twist of Fate" – 5:18
 "Make You Feel My Love" – 3:22
 "The Times They Are a-Changin'" – 3:40
 "All I Really Wanna Do" – 2:29
 "Knockin' on Heaven's Door" – 6:13
 "Positively Fourth Street" – 3:45
 "If Not for You" – 2:40
 "Baby, Let Me Follow You Down" (Traditional) – 2:13
 "Gates of Eden" – 5:12
 "All Along the Watchtower" – 3:46

Personnel

Musicians

 Bryan Ferry – vocals, Farfisa organ, harmonica, arrangements (9)
 Colin Good – pianos, string arrangements (3, 7)
 Paul Carrack – organ
 Brian Eno – electronics (8)
 Isaac Ferry – electronics (8)
 Leo Abrahams – atmosphere guitars
 Chris Spedding – guitars
 Oliver Thompson – guitars
 David Williams – guitars
 Mick Green – additional guitars (2, 6)
 Robin Trower – acoustic guitar (11)
 Guy Pratt – bass (1, 3–5, 7–11)
 Zev Katz – bass (2, 6)
 Andy Newmark – drums (1, 3–5, 7–11)
 Bobby Irwin – drums (2, 6)
 Frank Ricotti – percussion
 Lucy Wilkins – violin (2)
 Warren Ellis – string arrangements (7)
 Anthony Pleeth – cello (3, 7)
 Jon Thorne – viola (3)
 Jackie Shave – violin (3)
 Gavyn Wright – violin (3)
 Sarah Brown – backing vocals
 Me'sha Bryan – backing vocals
 Michelle John – backing vocals
 Joy Malcolm – backing vocals
 Anna McDonald – backing vocals
 Tara McDonald – backing vocals
 Sharon White – backing vocals

Technical
 Bryan Ferry – producer
 Rhett Davies – producer
 Colin Good – associate producer
 Neil Broadbank – engineer
 Michael Boddy – engineer
 Chris Mullings – engineer
 Tim Roe – engineer
 Bob Clearmountain – mixing
 Bob Ludwig – mastering
 Isaac Ferry – studio assistant 
 James Roper – studio assistant

Artwork
 Bogdan Zarkowski – design
 Anton Corbijn – cover photography
 Julian Broad – inner sleeve photography
 Rhett Davies – ferris photography
 Philip Lustig – ferris photography
 Pete Turner – ferris photography
 Bryan Ferry – art direction
 Paul Morley – liner notes

Charts

Weekly charts

Year-end charts

See also
List of songs written by Bob Dylan
List of artists who have covered Bob Dylan songs

Notes

References

2007 albums
Albums produced by Rhett Davies
Albums recorded at RAK Studios
Bob Dylan tribute albums
Bryan Ferry albums
Virgin Records albums